Joel Arellano Arellano (born 24 November 1978) is a Mexican politician affiliated with the National Action Party. As of 2018 he served as Deputy of the LX Legislature of the Mexican Congress representing Jalisco.

References

1978 births
Living people
Politicians from Jalisco
National Action Party (Mexico) politicians
21st-century Mexican politicians
University of Guadalajara alumni
Deputies of the LX Legislature of Mexico
Members of the Chamber of Deputies (Mexico) for Jalisco